Petter Andersen (born 2 January 1974) is a Norwegian speed skater. He was born in Oslo and represented the club Aktiv SK. He competed in the 1,000 m and 1,500 m at the 2002 Winter Olympics in Salt Lake City, and at the 2006 Winter Olympics in Turin.

References

External links

1974 births
Living people
Sportspeople from Oslo
Norwegian male speed skaters
Olympic speed skaters of Norway
Speed skaters at the 2002 Winter Olympics
Speed skaters at the 2006 Winter Olympics